The Pir Panjal Range  is a chain of mountains in the Lower Himalayan region running east-southeast to west-northwest, located primarily in the Kashmir region of the northern Indian subcontinent. It extends southeast from the Neelum River in the Pakistani administered western Azad Kashmir, through the Indian administered southwestern Jammu and Kashmir, to the upper Beas River in northwestern Himachal Pradesh state, India. The Himalayas show a gradual elevation towards the Dhauladhar and Pir Panjal ranges. Pir Panjal is the largest range of the Lesser Himalayas. Near the bank of the Sutlej River, it dissociates itself from the Himalayas and forms a divide between the Beas and Ravi rivers on one side and the Chenab on the other. The Galyat mountains are also located in this range.

Etymology
The Pir Panjal range is named after the Pir Panjal Pass, whose original name as recorded by Srivara, is Panchaladeva (IAST: Pāñcāladeva, meaning the deity of Panchala). Panchala is a country mentioned in the Mahabharata in the northwest Uttar Pradesh. However, there are also traditions that place the Mahabharata regions in western Punjab and southern Kashmir. Scholar Dineshchandra Sircar has analysed the geography described in the Shakti‐sangama Tantra, where this is indeed the case. Scholar M. A. Stein believes that the concept of deity must have been translated into that of a Pir after the region was Islamised.

Peaks of the range
Deo Tibba and Indrasan are two important peaks at the eastern end of the mountain range. They can be approached from both the Parvati-Beas Valley (Kulu District), Upper Belt of Chamba Himachal Pradesh and the Chandra (Upper Chenab) Valley (Lahaul and Spiti District) in Himachal Pradesh. The hill station of Gulmarg in Kashmir lies in this range.

Passes

Haji Pir Pass (altitude ) on the western Pir Panjal range on the road between Poonch and Uri in Indian-administered Kashmir. Despite taking the pass twice in military operations (in 1948 and 1965), India left the pass under Pakistani control.

The Pir Panjal Pass (also called Peer Ki Gali) connects the Kashmir valley with Rajouri and Poonch via the Mughal Road. The nearest town to the pass in the Kashmir valley is shopian.

The Banihal pass lies at the head of the Jhelum River at the southern end of the Kashmir Valley. Banihal and Qazigund lie on either side of the pass. 

The Sinthan pass connects Jammu and Kashmir with Kishtwar. 

Rohtang La (altitude ) is a mountain pass on the eastern Pir Panjal range connecting Manali in the Kullu Valley to Keylong in the Lahaul Valley.

Tunnels

Jawahar Tunnel
The Jawahar Tunnel was named after the first Prime Minister of India was constructed in the early 1950s and commissioned in December 1956 to ensure snow-free passage throughout the year. It was designed for 150 vehicles per day but now used by more than 7,000 vehicles per day. Therefore, a new wider and longer tunnel has been planned at a lower elevation.

Banihal Qazigund Road Tunnel

It is also less prone to snow avalanches as it is at a lower elevation.

Atal Tunnel

The Atal Tunnel has been built under the Rohtang Pass in the eastern Pir Panjal range of the Himalayas on the Leh-Manali Highway. The tunnel is at  elevation whereas the Rohtang pass is at  elevation. Lying on the Manali-Leh axis, this is one of the two routes to Ladakh.

Banihal Railway Tunnel

The Pir Panjal Railway Tunnel, an  railway tunnel, passes through the Pir Panjal Range in Jammu and Kashmir. It connects Quazigund and Banihal and is a part of the Udhampur-Srinagar-Baramulla railway project. The tunnel was commissioned on 26 June 2013 for regular service. It is India's longest railway tunnel.

See also
 Ganga Choti
 Banni Mata Temple

References

Further reading
 
 

Landforms of Jammu and Kashmir
Mountain ranges of India
Mountain ranges of Pakistan
Landforms of Azad Kashmir